Afshar Beylik was a Turkish beylik (principality) in Eastern Anatolia in the early 16th century.(Afşar and Avşar are alternative names)  It was founded by the Afshar tribe which was an Oghuz Turk tribe with Kızılbaş faith. The Afshar Beylik was the last of the Anatolian beyliks to be incorporated into the Ottoman Empire, in 1534.

Emergence 

In 1473 Mehmet II of the Ottoman Empire defeated Uzun Hasan of Akkoyunlu Turcoman Empire which was controlling the Eastern Anatolia (as well as territories in Iraq, Iran and Azerbaijan) This defeat was a severe blow to Akkoyunlu prestige and they lost their control on the north territories of the empire (which is roughly the north part of the Eastern Anatolia.) During the chaos, Sevindik Bey of Afshar tribe emerged as the new sovereign of the area in 1480s.

The beylik 

At the peak of its power the beylik controlled the area between  Alagyaz (now in Armenia) in the east and Kop Dağı (a mountain to the west of Erzurum, Turkey) in the west. When Akkoyunlu dynasty was replaced by Safavids (who were relatives of Akkoyunlu) Sevindik Bey formed a loose alliance with Ismail I of Safavids. However, during the campaign of Ottoman sultan Selim I over Safavids in 1514, he was careful not to provoke the Ottomans. In return Ottomans didn't annex any part of Afshar territory. Nevertheless, Sevindik, being Kızılbash renewed Safavid alliance after the death of Selim I.

End of the beylik
Ottomans decided to end the beylik. In 1534, during the 6th (Irakeyn) campaign of Suleyman I Pargalı İbrahim Pasha annexed the Afshar territory to Ottoman realm. In Erzurum a beylerbeylik (province) was established and a member of Dulkadir house was appointed as the beylerbey.

References

Anatolian beyliks
States and territories established in the 1480s
States and territories established by the Afshar tribe